OAZ may refer to:

OAZ1, ornithine decarboxylase antizyme, an enzyme that in humans is encoded by the OAZ1 gene
OAZ2, ornithine decarboxylase antizyme 2, an enzyme that in humans is encoded by the OAZ2 gene
Outer Artillery Zone, a narrow belt along the coast from Suffolk to Sussex in the Air Defence of Great Britain